League tables for teams participating in Kakkonen, the third tier of the Finnish football league system, in 2008.

League tables

Group A

Group B

Group C

Footnotes

References and sources
Finnish FA, Suomen Palloliitto 

Kakkonen seasons
3
Fin
Fin